Fluvionectes (meaning "river swimmer", from both Latin and Greek) is a genus of elasmosaurid plesiosaur found in the Dinosaur Park Formation in Alberta, Canada. It is known from a holotype, which includes parts of the trunk area, and from a much larger specimen referred to this taxon.

Description 
A much larger specimen indicates that this taxon may have reached  in maximum body length.

Classification 
The describers placed Fluvionectes in the Elasmosauridae, in a clade with Albertonectes, Nakonanectes, Styxosaurus, and Terminonatator, which by definition places it in the Elasmosaurinae subfamily.

Paleobiology 
Fluvionectes appears to have been a freshwater (and possibly brackish water) animal based on its discovery from a non-marine to paralic sedimentary unit. This is significantly different in contrast to most elasmosaurs which were oceanic.

References 

Elasmosaurids
Plesiosaurs
Campanian genera
Late Cretaceous reptiles of North America
Cretaceous Alberta
Paleontology in Alberta
Fossil taxa described in 2021
Sauropterygian genera